Shinobido may refer to:

 Shinobido: Way of the Ninja, stealth-based video game for the Sony PlayStation 2
 Shinobido: Tales of the Ninja, portable counterpart to the aforementioned title, appearing on the Sony PlayStation Portable
 Shinobido 2: Revenge of Zen, portable sequel for the PlayStation Vita
 Shinobido (film)